Kashmar UltraLight and Light Airport is an airport in the city of Kashmar in Iran, which is located on  of land southwest of Khorasan Razavi province, about  from the city of Mashhad. It only accepts light and ultra-light aircraft on its runway.

Kashmar Ultralight Airport is the first special light airport in the country that will protect this project from March 1993 with the construction of a tower. In 2016, the first plane landed and took off at this airport.

Kavian Parvaz Shargh Company, Kashmar Airport, with the efforts and perseverance of Captain Mohammad Reza Kaviani, has succeeded in obtaining the basic agreement of ultralight pilot training from the country's aviation organization.

Possibilities 
Kavian Airport Aviation Science and Technology Training Center is the largest and most equipped ultra-light aviation center in Kashmar with training in disciplines such as piloting, aircraft maintenance, dispatching, avionics and hospitality, as well as several training aircraft for student pilots and a large, well-equipped hangar for students studying maintenance and overhaul.

Land transportation 
Kashmar Airport can be reached from Mashhad via Road 36 by private car, taxi or bus.

See also 
Iran Airports Company
ICAO Airport Code

References

Airports in Iran
Kashmar